A cable modem termination system (CMTS, also called a CMTS Edge Router) is a piece of equipment, typically located in a cable company's headend or hubsite, which is used to provide high speed data services, such as cable Internet or Voice over Internet Protocol, to cable subscribers. A CMTS provides many of the same functions provided by the DSLAM in a DSL system.

Connections
In order to provide high speed data services, a cable company will connect its headend to the Internet via very high capacity data links to a network service provider. On the subscriber side of the headend, the CMTS enables communication with subscribers' cable modems. Different CMTSs are capable of serving different cable modem population sizes—ranging from 4,000 cable modems to 150,000 or more, depending in part on traffic. A given headend may have between 1-12 CMTSs to service the cable modem population served by that headend or HFC hub.

One way to think of a CMTS is to imagine a router with Ethernet interfaces (connections) on one side and coaxial cable RF interfaces on the other side. A CMTS has separate RF interfaces and connectors for downlink and uplink signals. The RF/coax interfaces carry RF signals to and from coaxial "trunks" connected to subscribers' cable modems, using one pair of connectors per trunk, one for downlink and the other for uplink. In other words, there is a pair of connectors for every service group. A service group may serve around 500 households. The RF signals from a CMTS, are connected via coaxial cable to an "optics platform" or headend platform, which has transmitter and  receiver modules that turn the RF signals into light pulses for delivery over fiber optics through an HFC network. An example of an optics platform is the Arris CH3000. At the other end of the network, an optical node converts the light pulses into RF signals again and sends them through a coaxial cable "trunk". The trunk has one or more amplifiers along its length, and on the trunk there are distribution "taps" to which customers' modems are connected via coaxial cable.

In fact, most CMTSs have both Ethernet interfaces (or other more traditional high-speed data interfaces like SONET) as well as RF interfaces.  In this way, traffic that is coming from the Internet can be routed (or bridged) through the Ethernet interface, through the CMTS and then onto the RF interfaces that are connected to the cable company's hybrid fiber coax (HFC). The traffic winds its way through the HFC to end up at the cable modem in the subscriber's home. Traffic from a subscriber's home system goes through the cable modem and out to the Internet in the opposite direction.

CMTSs typically carry only IP traffic. Traffic destined for the cable modem from the Internet, known as downstream traffic, is carried in IP packets encapsulated according to DOCSIS standard. These packets are carried on data streams that are typically modulated onto a TV channel using either 64-QAM or 256-QAM versions of quadrature amplitude modulation.

Upstream data (data from cable modems to the headend or Internet) is carried in Ethernet frames encapsulated inside DOCSIS frames modulated with QPSK, 16-QAM, 32-QAM, 64-QAM or 128-QAM using TDMA, ATDMA or S-CDMA frequency sharing mechanisms. This is usually done at the "subband" or "return" portion of the cable TV spectrum (also known as the "T" channels), a much lower part of the frequency spectrum than the downstream signal, usually 5–42 MHz in DOCSIS 2.0 or 5–65 MHz in EuroDOCSIS.

A typical CMTS allows a subscriber's computer to obtain an IP address by forwarding DHCP requests to the relevant servers. This DHCP server returns, for the most part, what looks like a typical response including an assigned IP address for the computer, gateway/router addresses to use, DNS servers, etc.

The CMTS may also implement some basic filtering to protect against unauthorized users and various attacks. Traffic shaping is sometimes performed to prioritize application traffic, perhaps based upon subscribed plan or download usage and also to provide guaranteed Quality of service (QoS) for the cable operator's own PacketCable-based VOIP service. However, the function of traffic shaping is more likely done by a Cable Modem or policy traffic switch. A CMTS may also act as a bridge or router.

A customer's cable modem cannot communicate directly with other modems on the line. In general, cable modem traffic is routed to other cable modems or to the Internet through a series of CMTSs and traditional routers. However, a route could conceivably pass through a single CMTS.

A CCAP (Converged Cable Access Platform) combines CMTS and Edge QAM functionality in a single device so that it can provide both data (internet) with CMTS functionality, and video (TV channels) with Edge QAM functionality. Edge QAM (Quadrature Amplitude Modulator/Modulation) converts video sent via IP (internet protocol) or otherwise, into a QAM signal for delivery over a cable network. Edge QAMs are normally standalone devices placed at the "edge" of a network.

Architectures
A CMTS can be broken down into two different architectures, Integrated CMTS (I-CMTS) or Modular (M-CMTS).  There are both pros and cons to each type of architecture.

Modular CMTS (M-CMTS)
In a M-CMTS solution the architecture is broken up into two components.  The first part is the Physical Downstream component (PHY) which is known as the Edge QAM (EQAM).  The second part is the IP networking and DOCSIS MAC Component which is referred to as the M-CMTS Core.  There are also several new protocols and components introduced with this type of architecture.  One is the DOCSIS Timing Interface, which provides a reference frequency between the EQAM and M-CMTS Core via a DTI Server.  The second is the Downstream External PHY Interface (DEPI).  The DEPI protocol controls the delivery of DOCSIS
frames from the M-CMTS Core to the EQAM devices   Some of the challenges that entail an M-CMTS platform are increased complexity in RF combining and an increase in the number of failure points.  One of the benefits of an M-CMTS architecture is that it is extremely scalable to larger numbers of downstream channels.

Manufacturers

Current
 ARRIS Group
 C9 Networks
 Catapult Technologies
 Coaxial Networks Inc.
 Casa Systems
 Cisco Systems
 Chongqing Jinghong
 Damery sa
 Gainspeed (Nokia company)
 WISI Communications GmbH
 Kathrein
 Suma Scientific
 Huawei Technologies
 Harmonic Inc.
 Teleste

Historical
 3COM (Acquired by HP)
 Broadband Access Systems (Acquired by ADC Telecommunications)
 ADC Telecommunications (CMTS business acquired by BigBand Networks)
 BigBand Networks (Exited CMTS business, remaining business later acquired by ARRIS)
 Cadant (Acquired by ARRIS)
 Com21 (CMTS business acquired by ARRIS)
 RiverDelta (Acquired by Motorola)
 Terayon (Acquired by Motorola)
 Pacific Broadband Communications (Acquired by Juniper Networks)
 Juniper Networks (Exited CMTS business)
 Motorola (Acquired by ARRIS)
 Daphne sa (Acquired by Damery sa)

See also
DOCSIS

References

External links

Digital cable
Internet access